Scott R. Isphording (born September 2, 1971) is an American college football coach and former player. He currently serves as the co-offensive coordinator and quarterbacks coach for the Ohio Bobcats.

Playing career
Isphording was a four-year letterwinner as a quarterback at Hanover College in Hanover, Indiana, playing from 1990 to 1993. He finished the 1992 season with 3,098 yards of passing, which stood as sixth-most in NCAA Division III history.

Coaching career
Isphording began his coaching career as a graduate student at Fort Hays State University in Hays, Kansas, serving as the Tigers' quarterbacks coach from 1994 to 1996. After leaving Fort Hays State, he was the quarterbacks and wide receivers coach at the Colorado School of Mines for three years. Isphording spent the following six years, from 1998 to 2003, on the staff at Wittenberg University as an offensive coordinator and quarterbacks coach, in addition to serving as the head men's golf coach in his final year there. From 1998 to 2002, he also served as an assistant coach on the Wittenberg baseball staff.

He took his first Division I job in 2004 when he was hired as the quarterbacks coach on Jeff Genyk's staff at Eastern Michigan University. After three years in this position, Isphording was promoted to offensive coordinator. In 2009, Isphording departed Eastern Michigan for Ohio University, where he served as the Bobcats' tight ends coach and recruiting coordinator for one year. Isphording then accepted a position as the quarterbacks coach at Toledo University; he held this position for two years before adding the roles of passing game coordinator and recruiting coordinator for his final two years.

Before the 2014 season, Isphording returned to Ohio to take the position of quarterbacks coach. He held this position for seven seasons before being promoted to co-offensive coordinator alongside Allen Rudolph, while still holding his previous position.

Personal life
Isphording is from Cincinnati, Ohio, and attended La Salle High School. He holds a Bachelor of Arts from Hanover College and a Master of Science in physical education from Fort Hays State University. He is married to his wife, Shelly, with whom he has two children.

References

Living people
1971 births
American football quarterbacks
Fort Hays State Tigers football coaches
Colorado Mines Orediggers football coaches
Wittenberg Tigers football coaches
Eastern Michigan Eagles football coaches
Toledo Rockets football coaches
Ohio Bobcats football coaches
Wittenberg Tigers baseball coaches
Hanover Panthers football players
College golf coaches in the United States
People from Cincinnati
Fort Hays State University alumni
21st-century American people